Staroshareyevo (İśke Şäräy) is a rural locality (a village) in Sakhayevsky Selsoviet, Karmaskalinsky District, Bashkortostan, Russia. The population was 565 as of 2010. There are 18 streets.

Geography 
Staroshareyevo is located 24 km northeast of Karmaskaly (the district's administrative centre) by road. Staroaktashevo is the nearest rural locality.

References 

Rural localities in Karmaskalinsky District